The Sree Narayana Dharma Paripalana Yogam (S.N.D.P) is a social service organization that has been representing the Ezhava community from the Indian state of Kerala since 1903. The S.N.D.P Yogam was founded by Dr.Padmanabhan Palpu and other Ezhava leaders with the blessing of Sree Narayana Guru. The organization aimed to lead the community to the religious reform movement and to achieve economic prosperity and educational opportunities. The organization has also been playing a significant role in the Kerala social and political movements since its formation.

The Sree Narayana Trust is founded by the SNDP Yogam to start, and manage educational, social, and economical institutions with the vision of Narayana Guru. Combined both the Yogam and the Trust present annual budgets of about ₹2,000,0000,00 (two hundred crore INR or USD 270 million).

Currently, the organization runs several educational institutes, hospitals, and other institutions.

Mission 
The S.N.D.P yogam is based on the principles and philosophy of Sree Narayana Guru. Guru devoted his life to working against the social and economical inequality, casteism, and superstitions in the Kerala society. The Yogam has the moral responsibility and the social duty to model the Sree Narayana dharmas.

History 
SNDP was founded in 1903 by Dr. Padmanabhan Palpu with the guidance and blessings of Sree Narayana Guru. SNDP was the first organization to envisage Kerala as a whole

Vavoottu Yogam expanded and formed an organization known as Aruvippuram Kshetra Yogam. The Aruvippuram Temple Society: known as Vavoottu Yogam emerged in 1888. 

During the 1890s, the caste system in Kerala had the concept of untouchables. Padmanabhan Palpu, better known as Dr. Palpu, started working towards ensuring the rights of the then identified backward  communities. With the 1891 Malayali Memorial Revolt, he took the leadership of the then oppressed community named Ezhava; and attempted to begin an organization called Ezhava Sabha. In 1896, he created the organizations' by-laws and published the law in Malayali, a newspaper published from Thankussery. He organized a few meetings at Paravur and Mayyanad, before the movement failed.

On January 7, 1903, a special meeting of Aruvippuram Kshetra Yogam was conducted. They decided to enlarge the organization to support the progress of all backward communities both religiously and materially. Thus, on May 15, 1903, with Narayana Guru as its president, Aruvippuram Kshetra Yogam was registered as Aruvippuram Sree Narayana Dharma Paripalana Yogam according to the Indian Companies Act, No.6, 1882.

The deity at the Sree Bhavaneeswara temple, Lord Shiva, was consecrated by Sree Narayana Guru on March 8, 1916 (24-07-1091 M.E.). After the ceremony, Gurudevan laid the foundation stone for the Lower Primary School under the SNDP.

See also 
 List of Ezhavas
 Sivagiri, Kerala 
 Sree Narayana Trust

References

External links
 Sree Dharma Paripalana Yogam website

Anti-caste movements
Charities based in India
Hindu relief organizations
Hindu organisations based in India
Hindu new religious movements
Narayana Guru
Ezhava
Religious organizations established in 1903
1903 establishments in India